GURPS Atomic Horror is a supplement for the third edition of the GURPS role-playing game. Atomic Horror is a sourcebook for running GURPS campaigns inspired by B-grade science fiction and horror movies of the 1950s. It also has value to GURPS players and GMs as a sourcebook on the culture and technology of the period.

Contents
According to reviewer Shane Hensley, "Atomic Horror is a source book is about the B-grade movies primarily made in the 50s." The module details five alien races in the mold of the science fiction movies of the period: the Arendians, "energy fog" creatures who possess human host bodies; the human-seeming Loi, who may in fact be the ancestors of the human race; the brain-eating Metarans; the genetically engineered Alphans; and the far-future Vortuns, who inhabit the year 6000 and draw people forward in time (they are responsible for the Bermuda Triangle) to have their disembodied brains implanted into healthy bodies untainted by the future wars that nearly destroyed humanity.

Publication history
The module was written by Paul Elliott and Chris McCubbin and published by Steve Jackson Games. The module was first published in 1993 and subsequently revised.

Reception
Shane Hensley reviewed GURPS Atomic Horror in a 1993 issue of White Wolf. He said that it was "a near perfect example of what a source hook should be" and "a gaming classic", while recommending it for those interested in horror campaigns or humorous gaming. Overall he rated it a 4 out of a possible 5.

References

External links
Atomic Horror review at RPGnet

1993 books
Atomic Horror
Role-playing game supplements introduced in 1993